Savignia nenilini is a species of sheet weaver found in Russia. It was described by Marusik in 1988.

References

Linyphiidae
Spiders of Russia
Spiders described in 1988